is a private university in Kodaira, Tokyo, Japan, established in 2005. The predecessor of the school was founded in 1942. The foundation that operates the school also operates a separate institution called Shiraume Gakuen Junior College.

External links
 Official website 

Educational institutions established in 1942
Private universities and colleges in Japan
Universities and colleges in Tokyo
1942 establishments in Japan
Kodaira, Tokyo